Statistics of Úrvalsdeild in the 1936 season.

Overview
It was contested by four teams, and Valur won the championship. Valur's Óskar Jónsson was the top scorer with five goals.

League standings

Results

References

Úrvalsdeild karla (football) seasons
Iceland
Iceland
Urvalsdeild